Thomas Richards may refer to:

 Thomas Richards (priest) (c. 1687–1760), Welsh priest and writer
 Thomas Richards (cricketer) (1855–1923), Australian cricketer
 Thomas Richards (film editor) (1899–1946), American film editor
 Thomas Richards (historian) (1878–1962), Welsh historian, author and librarian
 Thomas Richards (mayor) (born 1943), mayor of Rochester, New York
 Thomas Richards (Welsh politician) (1859–1931), Welsh Labour Party Member of Parliament
 Thomas Richards of Coychurch (c. 1710–1790), Welsh curate and lexicographer
 Thomas C. Richards (1930–2020), United States Air Force general
 Thomas R. Richards, United States Navy admiral
 Thomas Frederick Richards (1863–1942), British Member of Parliament for Wolverhampton West, 1906–1910
 Thomas Addison Richards (1820–1900), American landscape artist
 Thomas F. Richards was lynched in Mer Rouge, Louisiana in August of 1922

See also
 Tom Richards (disambiguation)
 Thomas Richardson (disambiguation)
 Richards (surname)